Adjoua Sandrine Kouadio (born 22 March 1996), known as Sandrine Kouadio, is an Ivorian footballer who plays as a  forward or a both-sides fullback for the Ivory Coast women's national team.

International career
Kouadio capped for Ivory Coast at senior level during the 2019 WAFU Zone B Women's Cup.

See also
List of Ivory Coast women's international footballers

References

1996 births
Living people
Ivorian women's footballers
Women's association football forwards
Women's association football fullbacks
Ivory Coast women's international footballers